Shaitaan is a 1974 Hindi thriller film, directed by Firoze Chinoy starring Shatrughan Sinha and Sharmila Tagore in main roles. Majrooh Sultanpuri wrote the songs for this film while Rahul Dev Burman was the music director.

Plot
Anand (Shatrughan Sinha) and Munish (Anil Dhawan) are two best friends. Anand is an honest police officer whereas Munish is the most famous lawyer of the city. Munish's sister Nisha is in love with Anand.

There are series of rapes and murders in the film. Anand discovers that all the victim girls were connected with Munish. One girl Shabnam, miraculously escapes from the hands of Munish. Anand arrests Munish on the charges of rape and murder but Shabnam identifies Anand as the killer and the rapist. The confusion arose because the actual killer is Anand's lookalike Ashok.

Cast
 Shatrughan Sinha as Inspector Anand / Ashok (Double Role)
 Sharmila Tagore as Nisha
 Anil Dhawan as Advocate Munish
 Bindu as Sabrina
 Kumud Chuggani as Lily Fernandes (Air Hostess)
 Aruna Irani as Banjaran
 D.K. Sapru as Police Commissioner
 Tun Tun as Meena Advani
 Sulochana Latkar as Radha
 Padma Khanna as Shabnam
 Jagdeep as Maqtulla
 Komal as Munish's Date

Soundtrack

External links 
 

1974 films
1970s Hindi-language films
Indian thriller films
Indian slasher films
Films scored by R. D. Burman
1970s thriller films
1970s slasher films
Hindi-language thriller films